Richard Barham Middleton (28 October 1882 – 1 December 1911) was an English poet and author. He is remembered most for his short ghost stories, in particular "The Ghost Ship".

Biography
Born in Staines, Middlesex, Middleton was educated at Cranbrook School, Kent. He then worked as a clerk at the Royal Exchange Assurance Corporation bank in London from 1901 to 1907. Unhappy with that, he affected a Bohemian life at night – he is mentioned, in disguised terms, in Arthur Ransome's Bohemia in London. He moved out of his parents' house into rooms in Blackfriars and joined the New Bohemians, a club where he acquired literary contacts, including Arthur Machen, Louis McQuilland (1880–1946) and Christopher Wilson.

Middleton became an editor at Vanity Fair under Edgar Jepson, where he confided to his fellow editor Frank Harris that he really wanted to make a living as a poet. Shortly afterwards, Harris published Middleton's poem "The Bathing Boy":

His work was also published by Austin Harrison in The English Review, and he wrote book reviews for The Academy.

Middleton suffered from severe depression, then termed melancholia. He spent his last nine months in Brussels, where in December 1911 he took his life by poisoning himself with chloroform, which had been prescribed as a remedy for his condition. His literary reputation was sustained by Edgar Jepson and Arthur Machen, the latter in an introduction to Middleton's collection The Ghost Ship and Other Stories, and later by John Gawsworth. His stories appeared in several anthologies.

An encounter with Middleton is said to have persuaded the young Raymond Chandler to postpone his career as a writer. Chandler wrote, "Middleton struck me as having far more talent than I was ever likely to possess; and if he couldn't make a go of it, it wasn't very likely that I could."

Works
Poems and Songs (1912)
Poems and Songs Second Series (1912)
The Day Before Yesterday (essays, 1912)
The Ghost Ship and Other Stories (1912) 
Monologues (1913) 
Queen Melanie and the Woodboy (novel, 1931)
The Pantomime Man (stories, 1933)
Richard Middleton (poems, 1937), Richards Press

References

Sources
Richard Middleton's Letters to Henry Savage (1929, Mandrake Press) edited by Henry Savage
Henry Savage; Richard Middleton: The Man And His Work (1922, London: Cecil Palmer)

External links 

Stephen Wayne Foster: A Poet's Death Retrieved 22 October 2016.

1882 births
1911 suicides
English horror writers
People educated at Cranbrook School, Kent
Ghost story writers
English male short story writers
English male poets
20th-century English poets
20th-century British short story writers
20th-century English male writers
Suicides by poison
Suicides in Belgium